The Gneisenau Memorial on Bebelplatz green space in Berlin's Mitte district commemorates the Prussian field marshal and freedom fighter August Neidhardt von Gneisenau (1760–1831). Created from 1840 to 1855 by Christian Daniel Rauch in neoclassical style, it is a piece of the Berlin school of sculpture. Until 1950 the bronze statue stood at the front of Unter den Linden avenue, with which it formed an urban ensemble, and since 1963 it has stood at the back of Bebelplatz green space.

Gallery

See also 
 Blücher Memorial, Berlin
 Yorck Memorial, Berlin

References

Further reading

External links 

 Gneisenau Memorial – Berlin Monument Authority (in German)

Bronze sculptures in Germany
Monuments and memorials in Berlin
Outdoor sculptures in Berlin
Sculptures of men in Germany
Statues in Berlin